The baritone horn, or sometimes just called baritone, is a low-pitched brass instrument in the saxhorn family. It is a piston-valve brass instrument with a bore that is mostly conical (like the higher pitched flugelhorn and alto (tenor) horn) but it has a narrower bore compared to the similarly pitched euphonium. It uses a wide-rimmed cup mouthpiece like that of its peers, the trombone and euphonium. Like the trombone and the euphonium, the baritone horn can be considered either a transposing or non-transposing instrument.

In the UK, the baritone horn is part of the standardised instrumentation of brass bands. In concert band music, there is often a part marked baritone, but these parts are most commonly intended for, and played on, the euphonium. A baritone can also play music written for a trombone due to similarities in timbre and range.

Construction and general characteristics 

The baritone, like the trombone and euphonium, is a nine-foot brass tube. Valves are most often piston-style. It is predominantly of conical bore, like the euphonium, but has a narrower bore than the euphonium. The smaller bore renders its attack more distinct than the rounder attack of the euphonium, and also provides it with a brighter sound than the dark-sounding euphonium.

Key
The baritone is pitched in concert B, meaning that when no valves are actuated, the instrument will produce partials of the B harmonic series. Music for the baritone horn can be written in either the bass clef or the treble clef. When written in the bass clef, the baritone horn is a non-transposing instrument. However, when written in the treble clef, it is often used as transposing instrument, transposing downward a major ninth from the music as written, so that written middle C for the baritone is concert B below low C (B2 in scientific pitch notation), with the fingerings thus matching those of the trumpet but sounding an octave lower. It is often used to play parts written for the similarly pitched tenor trombone or euphonium.

Range
The baritone is part of the tenor section of a band. Its second partial with no valves pressed is concert B on the second line from the bottom of the bass clef (B2 in scientific pitch notation). The eighth partial with no valves pressed is concert B in the center of the treble clef (B4). Virtuosi can reach certain pedal tones below the E2 second partial with all valves depressed, which is the nominal lowest note on the instrument, and several half-tones above the B4, which is the nominal top of the instrument's range.

Tone
The baritone sounds with a timbre between the brightness of the trombone and the more mellow tone of the euphonium.

Distinguishing the baritone horn from the euphonium 

Although both baritone horn and euphonium produce partials of the B harmonic series in the same range, and both have a nine-foot-long main tube, the baritone horn tends to have a smaller and more cylindrical bore than the euphonium which is more conical. The baritone horn usually has a tighter wrap and a smaller bell, and is thus smaller and lighter overall, and produces a "lighter" and more direct sound versus the more solid, round timbre of the euphonium.

There is a common misconception that three-valve instrument is a baritone and that the four-valve instrument is a euphonium. Euphoniums often have a fourth valve as an alternate fingering for 1&3 split fingering with improved intonation. The fourth valve can also be viewed in the same way as an F trigger on trombone, repitching the instrument to expand the lower range. A fourth valve is less common on baritones, but absence of a fourth valve is not a defining characteristic.

An "American baritone", featuring three valves on the front of the instrument and a curved forward-pointing bell, was common in American school bands throughout most of the twentieth century. While this instrument is in reality a conical-cylindrical bore hybrid, neither truly euphonium nor baritone, it was almost universally labeled a "baritone" by both band directors and composers.

Marching baritone horn

Specially wrapped versions of the baritone horn have been created for use in marching bands and drum and bugle corps. They have three valves and a front-facing bell and are the tenor voice of a drum and bugle corps, below the soprano voice of the trumpet, the alto voice of alto horn or mellophone, and above the low tubas.

Artists
Notable artists who are today referenced as great baritone horn players include Ruth Mellor, Simone Mantia, Helen Harrelson, Katrina Marzella, and Leonard Falcone. The Leonard Falcone International Tuba and Euphonium Festival is a notable venue for aspiring artists on euphonium, but its namesake played baritone horn on his many recordings.

Trumpeter Maynard Ferguson used a baritone horn in the song "Gospel John" and in one of his three solos (the other two involving a valved trombone and a trumpet) in a live performance of his song "Great Guns".

Japanese free-improvisation trumpeter Toshinori Kondo has played baritone horn on some dates and recordings (e.g., Jazz Bunker), as has saxophonist Ralph Carney (e.g., Night on Earth).

References 

B-flat instruments
Horns
Marching band instruments